Ralph Jecha (December 1, 1931 – May 15, 2018) was an American football guard and linebacker. He played for the Chicago Bears in 1955 and for the Pittsburgh Steelers in 1956.

He died on May 15, 2018, in Oak Lawn, Illinois at age 86.

References

1931 births
2018 deaths
American football guards
American football linebackers
Northwestern Wildcats football players
Chicago Bears players
Pittsburgh Steelers players